Anancylus vivesi is a species of beetle in the family Cerambycidae. It was described by Stephan von Breuning in 1978. It is known from Papua New Guinea.

References

Mesosini
Beetles described in 1978